Salsat toum or toumya  (Arabic pronunciation of 'garlic') is a garlic sauce common to the Levant. Similar to the Provençal aioli, there are many variations, a common one containing garlic, salt, olive oil or vegetable oil, and lemon juice, traditionally crushed together using a wooden mortar and pestle. There is also a variation popular in many places, such as the town of Zgharta, in Lebanon, where mint is added; it is called  ('oil and garlic').

Salsat toum (garlic sauce) is used as a dip, especially with french fries, chicken and artichoke, and in Levantine sandwiches, especially those containing chicken. It is also commonly served with grilled chicken dishes.

Variants and similar 
In the Lebanese city of Zagarta, fresh mint leaves are often included, and it is called zeit wa tum ("oil and garlic"). Toum sauce differs from aioli in the proportion of garlic added, which is much higher in the case of toum. Sometimes, the sauce is thickened by adding eggs or labneh (yogurt).

See also
 List of Middle Eastern dishes

References

External links
 

Levantine cuisine
Garlic dishes
Sauces
Middle Eastern cuisine